The Autorité de Régulation des Communications Électroniques et des Postes (ARCEP) is an independent agency in charge of regulating telecommunications and postal services in Burkina Faso.

External links

References 

Government  of Burkina Faso

Mass media regulation